Katok Tsewang Norbu' (1698–1755) was a teacher of the Nyingma school of Tibetan Buddhism who notably championed the shentong or "empty of other" view first popularised by the Jonang school as well as examining the Chan Buddhist teachings of Hashang Mahayana, known as Moheyan. Despite the shentong view being banned as heretical, he successfully taught and cultivated its teachings as a legitimate view among the Nyingmapa.

His seat was the Katok Monastery of Tibet.

Scholarly impact
Katok Tsewang Norbu's interests spanned many of the important non-Gelug teachings of Tibetan Buddhism and Bon, including several not associated with the Nyingma schools:

His interest in Chan, which was popularly understood as "defeated" as a teaching in Tibet at a famous debate and even has a Cham dance ridiculing Hashang Mahayana, may have been spurred by Gelug attacks on Nyingma teachings such as Dzogchen as well as against other "simultaneist" teachings of the Sarma schools such as Mahamudra.

Shentong
After the suppression of the Jonang school, its scholars and its texts and the work of the Sakya scholar Serdok Penchen Sakya Chokden (1428–1507) by the 5th Dalai Lama and the Gelug religio-political establishment in the 17th century, shentong views were propagated mainly by Karma Kagyu and Nyingma lamas. In particular, Situ Panchen, the 8th Tai Situpa (1700–1774), and Katok Tsewang Norbu were very instrumental in reviving Shentong among their sects. Katok Tsewang Norbu was the Situ Panchen's teacher, but it was the latter who had a lasting effect on the larger Tibetan Buddhist community. "In the end it would be Situ more than anyone who would create the environment for the widespread acceptance of the Zhentong theories in the next century." This revival was continued by Jamgon Kongtrul, a 19th-century Rimé movement scholar and a forceful partisan of shentong. More recently, the Kagyu Lamas Kalu Rinpoche and Khenpo Tsultrim Gyamtso Rinpoche also taught the shentong view.

References

 Rigpa Shedra (July 24, 2008). 'Katok Monastery'. Source:  (accessed: Sunday August 17, 2008)

1698 births
1755 deaths
Nyingma lamas
Tibetan Buddhists from Tibet
17th-century Tibetan people
18th-century Tibetan people
17th-century lamas
18th-century lamas